The Sign of Four is a 1932 British crime film directed by Graham Cutts and starring Arthur Wontner, Ian Hunter and Graham Soutten. The film is based on Arthur Conan Doyle's second Sherlock Holmes novel The Sign of the Four (1890). The film is also known as The Sign of Four: Sherlock Holmes' Greatest Case.

It is the third film in the 1931–1937 film series starring Wontner as Sherlock Holmes.

A young woman needs Sherlock Holmes for protection when she's tormented by an escaped killer. However, when the woman is abducted, Holmes and Watson must infiltrate the city's criminal underworld to track down the young woman.

Plot
Jonathan Small, a prisoner serving a lengthy sentence on the Andaman Islands cuts a deal with two army officers, Major Sholto and Captain Morstan, in command of the prison. He reveals the location of a stash of loot in exchange for their help in helping him to escape from jail. The proceeds are to be split equally between the three of them.

Sholto and Morstan go to investigate the treasure which is hidden in an old Indian fortress. When they unearth the valuable trinkets behind a brick wall it sparks a violent quarrel between the two men with each wanting to take all of the treasure. After a struggle Sholto kills his accomplice and returns to England without fulfilling his pledge to help Small escape.

A number of years later Sholto is now living in London in great wealth thanks to his theft of the treasure. However, he is disturbed to read of the escape from jail of Small. He becomes haunted by the sound of Small's wooden leg and is convinced he will shortly be killed in revenge for his past betrayal of the convict. He calls his sons Bartholomew and Theodore to him and tells them of his murky past that had gained him the wealth on which the family fortune is built. He reveals that Morstan had a daughter, Mary, and instructs his sons to send her a valuable necklace and split their inheritance with her. Shortly afterwards Sholto is murdered before he can reveal the location of the bulk of his treasure.

The killing has been committed by Small who has broken out of jail with two accomplices, a heavily-tattooed convict and a native named Tonga. He reveals himself and menaces Theodore into telling him about Miss Morstan. The gang soon begin threatening Miss Morstan in the hope that she will hand over her share of the treasure to them. Frightened, she calls in Sherlock Holmes to help her protect herself. She is approached by Theodore, who reveals that the secret hiding place of the treasure has been discovered, and offers her the share as instructed by his father, and takes them to the family house.

However, when they arrive there Bartholomew is dead, and the treasure is missing. Holmes has his theory about the murder, but the innocent Theodore is arrested for murder by the incompent detective from Scotland Yard. Holmes and Watson set out to prove Theodore's innocence and track down the gang who are threatening Miss Morstan. They soon discover that Small and his accomplices are waiting to take the necklace from Mary Morstan to complete their haul and then flee the country and are hiding out in a circus. Watson unwisely takes Mary to investigate, and she is forcibly taken by them. Small's gang plan to make their escape by boat up the River Thames, but they are pursued by Holmes and Watson. The film climaxes in a shoot-out at a deserted warehouse.

Cast 
Arthur Wontner as Sherlock Holmes
Isla Bevan as Mary Morstan
Ian Hunter as Dr. John H. Watson
Graham Soutten as Jonathan Small
Miles Malleson as Thaddeus Sholto
Herbert Lomas as Major John Sholto
Gilbert Davis as Det. Insp. Atherly Jones
Margaret Yarde as Mrs. Smith
Roy Emerton as The Tattooed Man
 Charles Farrell as Funfair Patron 
 Clare Greet as Mrs Hudson
 Moore Marriott as Mordecai Smith
 Edgar Norfolk as Captain Morstan 
 Kynaston Reeves as Bartholomew Sholto 
 Ernest Sefton as Barrett 
 Mr. Burnhett as Tattoo Artist 
 Togo as Tonga

Production
After the successes of The Sleeping Cardinal and The Missing Rembrandt, Wontner was lured away from Twickenham Studios to make a Sherlock Holmes film for Associated Radio Pictures. Graham Cutts was hired to direct with Rowland V. Lee as a production supervisor. To de-age the leads, Wontner was given a thick toupée and regular Watson Ian Fleming was replaced by the younger Ian Hunter.

Unlike other adaptations of Conan Doyle's story, screenwriter W.P. Lipscomb had the flashback scenes placed at the beginning making the film unfold chronologically. Lipscomb took some great liberties with the story and the characters having Holmes make some large leaps in logic such as deducing a letter's author having only one leg based on handwriting alone and deducing the source of a rope based on traces of malt. He also moves the address from the famed 221B Baker Street to 22A.

Bibliography
 Low, Rachael. Filmmaking in 1930s Britain. George Allen & Unwin, 1985.
 Perry, George. Forever Ealing. Pavilion Books, 1994.

References

External links 

1932 films
1930s crime thriller films
1930s mystery thriller films
British crime thriller films
British mystery thriller films
Sherlock Holmes films based on works by Arthur Conan Doyle
British black-and-white films
Films set in India
Films set in London
Associated Talking Pictures
Films directed by Graham Cutts
1930s English-language films
1930s British films